Omi Vaidya (born January 10, 1982) is an American actor of Indian descent who works in Bollywood films. He is best known for his performance as Chatur Ramalingam or "Silencer" in the 2009 buddy-drama film, 3 Idiots. In addition, Vaidya has played roles on The Office and Arrested Development. Omi has directed many short films and worked as a feature film editor. He has also appeared in a number of commercials and works as a producer.

Background
Vaidya was raised in Joshua Tree in Yucca Valley, California. He graduated from the Los Angeles County High School for the Arts and later attended the University of California, Santa Cruz for two years. He then transferred to the Tisch School of the Arts at New York University and graduated with honors.

Vaidya commented on his background in an interview:

Personal life
Vaidya married Minal Patel on August 22, 2009. In 2015, Minal gave birth to their first child. Their second child was born in 2018.

Career
After college, Vaidya began to work as an editor for horror and South Asian feature films. He continued to act as well and received small roles in television programs and commercials. After receiving a small role in Arrested Development, he was asked to audition for the role of Sadiq for  The Office by the same casting director. He portrayed Sadiq in two episodes: "E-mail Surveillance" and "Fun Run." He was also seen in Bones.

3 Idiots
Vaidya's most notable performance is in a supporting role in the 2009 Bollywood film, 3 Idiots as Chatur Ramalingam (or "The Silencer"). He received strong reviews for his performance. Vaidya auditioned for the role of Chatur while on a trip to Mumbai. After passing the first audition, he was asked during the second to read dialogue from Lage Raho Munna Bhai. Vaidya states that he "just rattled it off without exactly understanding the words, almost like the speech scene in 3 Idiots." After being signed for the part of Chatur, he was told not to study Hindi, not to watch Hindi films, and to gain weight.

Of his success in the film, Vaidya credits the atmosphere of the cast and crew stating that in Mumbai there is "a personal touch, unlike Hollywood. Even if they don't pay you by the hour and there is no extra time, there is warmth and care. I basically saw my Bollywood innings as a challenge. A lot of credit also goes to Raju and Abhijat Joshi for the way the character came across on screen." He was also discouraged from providing interviews before the release. Vaidya states: "Before the film released, I asked director Rajkumar Hirani if I could give a couple of interviews. He stopped me saying nobody knew me and I should wait till the film is released. My role was a surprise they had planned for the audience." Vaidya later recalled that, "When I was at the premiere of 3 Idiots, no one recognized me. I was a bit depressed but when it got over, it was difficult for me to even get out of the theater. I have been enamored by the love and appreciation I have received from the audience. Today, when I go out on streets, people come and shake hands with me. It feels nice."

Big in Bollywood
Big in Bollywood (2011) is a documentary film about American actor Omi Vaidya's journey from a struggling Hollywood actor to a successful Bollywood breakthrough with 3 Idiots. It was sold to Netflix and is now available on YouTube.

Awards
2010 Screen Awards
Won: Best Comedian – 3 Idiots
Won: Most Promising Newcomer – Male – 3 Idiots
2010 IIFA Awards
Nominated: Best Performance in a Comic Role – 3 Idiots
Won: Star Debut of the Year – Male – 3 Idiots
2008 The Valley Film Festival 
Won: Best Short Film – The Desert Rose
2008 Port Townsend Film Festival 
Won: Best Film with Diversity Theme – The Desert Rose
2008 The Valley Film Festival 
Won: Best Student Film – Out of Time

Selected filmography

Actor
Films

Television series

As director

As editor

References

External links

 
 

1982 births
Living people
21st-century American male actors
Male actors from California
American Hindus
American male actors of Indian descent
American people of Marathi descent
American male television actors
Male actors in Hindi cinema
People from Yucca Valley, California
American expatriates in India
American expatriate actors in India
Tisch School of the Arts alumni
University of California, Santa Cruz alumni
Los Angeles County High School for the Arts alumni
Screen Awards winners
International Indian Film Academy Awards winners